Blood and Bone is the fifth fantasy novel by Canadian author Ian Cameron Esslemont set in the world of the Malazan Book of the Fallen, co-created with Esslemont's friend and colleague Steven Erikson.  Blood and Bone is the fifth of six novels in Esslemont’s Novels of the Malazan Empire series.

References

2012 Canadian novels
High fantasy novels
Novels of the Malazan Empire
Bantam Press books
Tor Books books